Eugen Slivca (born 13 July 1989) is a Moldovan footballer who plays as a midfielder for League of Ireland First Division club Athlone Town.

References

External links
 

1989 births
Living people
Moldovan footballers
Association football midfielders
Moldova youth international footballers
Moldovan Super Liga players
FC Academia Chișinău players
FC Zimbru Chișinău players
FC Speranța Crihana Veche players
FC Milsami Orhei players
FC Sfîntul Gheorghe players
Athlone Town A.F.C. players
League of Ireland players
Place of birth missing (living people)
Expatriate association footballers in the Republic of Ireland